Onawa is a city in, and the county seat of, Monona County, Iowa, United States. The population was 2,906 at the time of the 2020 Census. It is the largest town on the Iowa side of the Missouri River between Council Bluffs and Sioux City.

History
Onawa was named for a character mentioned in the poem The Song of Hiawatha by Henry Wadsworth Longfellow. Onawa was platted in 1857, and the railway arrived to the city in 1867. The city is known for having the widest main street in the continental United States.

Onawa was the site of a prisoner-of-war (POW) camp for captured German soldiers between 1944 and 1946. Historical documents indicate there were never more than 50 POWs in camp. A larger camp existed near the central Iowa town of Algona, and housed as many as 5,400 German POWs.

Geography
Onawa's longitude and latitude coordinates in decimal form are 42.027490, -96.096513.

Onawa is located in the Loess Hills region of western Iowa, a unique geological and environmental area. Nearby are such natural areas as Lewis & Clark State Park, Preparation Canyon State Park, and the Loess Hills State Forest.

Demographics

2010 census
As of the 2010 Census, there were 2,998 people, 1,345 households, and 756 families living in the city. The racial makeup of the city was 95.4% non-Hispanic White, 0.4% non-Hispanic Black or African American, 1.7% Native American, 0.3% Asian, 0.1% from other races, and 1.0% from two or more races. Hispanic or Latino people of any race were 1.2% of the population.

There were 1,345 households, of which 25.8% had children under the age of 18 living with them, 41.6% were married couples living together, 9.7% had a female householder with no husband present, 4.9% had a male householder with no wife present, and 43.8% were non-families. Thirty-eight point nine percent of all households were made up of individuals, and 20.9% had someone living alone who was 65 years of age or older. The average household size was 2.18 and the average family size was 2.91.

The median age in the city was 44.8 years. Twenty-three point two of residents were under the age of 18; 6.2% were between the ages of 18 and 24; 20.8% were from 25 to 44; 25.8% were from 45 to 64; and 24% were 65 years of age or older. The gender makeup of the city was 47.5% male and 52.5% female.

2000 census
As of the census of 2000, there were 3,091 people, 1,329 households, and 796 families living in the city. The racial makeup of the city was 97.86% White, 0.03% African American, 1.16% Native American, 0.19% Asian, 0.03% Pacific Islander, 0.03% from other races, and 0.68% from two or more races. 1.07% of the population are Hispanic or Latino of any race.

There were 1,329 households, out of which 25.4% had children under the age of 18 living with them, 47.3% were married couples living together, 9.4% had a female householder with no husband present, and 40.1% were non-families. 35.0% of all households were made up of individuals, and 20.2% had someone living alone who was 65 years of age or older. The average household size was 2.25 and the average family size was 2.89.

Population spread: 22.8% under the age of 18, 6.1% from 18 to 24, 24.4% from 25 to 44, 21.2% from 45 to 64, and 25.4% who were 65 years of age or older. The median age was 42 years. For every 100 females, there were 88.1 males. For every 100 females age 18 and over, there were 83.2 males.

The median income for a household in the city was $34,796, and the median income for a family was $41,250. Males had a median income of $27,981 versus $20,292 for females. The per capita income for the city was $17,928. About 3.3% of families and 6.3% of the population were below the poverty line, including 4.9% of those under age 18 and 8.2% of those age 65 or over.

Education
West Monona Community School District operates public schools serving the community.

Culture

The Eskimo Pie was created in Onawa in 1920 by Chris Nelson, an ice cream shop owner.

Notable people
E. Wight Bakke, educator; born and raised in Onawa
John Stevens Berry, attorney and author; born and raised in Onawa
Kristine Jepson, opera singer
Neil E. McNeil (Oklahoma), attorney and justice o Oklahoma Supreme Court, born in Onawa
Wayne M. Ropes, businessman and Iowa Secretary of State; born and raised in Onawa

References

External links

Onawa Government, Chamber of Commence, and more
City-Data - comprehensive statistical data and more about Onawa

 
Cities in Monona County, Iowa
Cities in Iowa
County seats in Iowa